Jagannath Prasad Agrawal  was an Indian politician. He was a Member of Parliament elect, representing Uttar Pradesh in the Rajya Sabha the upper house of India's Parliament representing the Indian National Congress.

References

Rajya Sabha members from Uttar Pradesh
Indian National Congress politicians from Uttar Pradesh
Year of birth missing
Year of death missing